The bluefin stoneroller (Campostoma pauciradii) is a fish in the family Cyprinidae endemic to the southeastern United States.

Distribution
It is found primarily in the Altamaha and Apalachicola river watersheds in Georgia and Alabama. There are also records from the Alabama and Tennessee river watersheds in Georgia.

Ecology
The bluefin stoneroller lives in rocky riffles, runs, and sometimes pools in streams.

Life history
It can be distinguished from other members of the genus Campostoma by its number of gill rakers, which usually number 12-16, as well as the blue-green fin coloration in breeding males and meristic trait variation.

References

Campostoma
Fish described in 1983
Taxa named by Brooks M. Burr
Taxa named by Robert Cashner